The 1976 AFC Youth Championship was held in Bangkok, Thailand.

Teams
The following teams entered the tournament:

 
 
 
 
 
 
 
 
 
 
 
 
 
 
  (host)

Brunei withdrew.

Group stage

Group A

Group B

Group C

Tie-breaker play-off

Group D

Quarterfinals

Semifinals

Third place match

Final

External links
Results by RSSSF

AFC U-19 Championship
1976
Youth
1976 in Thai sport
1976 in youth association football